The Oakleigh Garden Historic District is a historic district in Mobile, Alabama, United States. It was placed on the National Register of Historic Places on 13 April 1972. It is centered on Washington Square and was originally bounded by Government, Marine, Texas, and Ann Streets. A boundary increase on 30 January 1991 increased the boundaries to Rapier Avenue, Selma,  Broad, and Texas Streets. The buildings range in age from the 1820s to the 1940s with most in a variety of 19th-century architectural styles.

Gallery

References

Historic districts in Mobile, Alabama
National Register of Historic Places in Mobile, Alabama
Neoclassical architecture in Alabama
Federal architecture in Alabama
Greek Revival houses in Alabama
Italianate architecture in Alabama
American Craftsman architecture in Alabama
Historic districts on the National Register of Historic Places in Alabama